Ryu Su-jong is a North Korean ice hockey player. She was a member of the Unified Korean team at the 2018 Winter Olympics, and has represented the country at multiple IIHF Division 2A Women's World Championships, including 2018 when the team won bronze.

She played for the Kimchaek youth team.

References

External links
 Biographical information and career statistics from Elite Prospects

1995 births
Ice hockey players at the 2018 Winter Olympics
Living people
North Korean women's ice hockey defencemen
North Korean women's ice hockey players
Winter Olympics competitors for Korea